Sperotto is an Italian surname. Notable people with the surname include:

Germana Sperotto (born 1964), Italian cross-country skier
Giannantonio Sperotto (born 1950), Italian footballer
Maria Vittoria Sperotto (born 1996), Italian cyclist
Nicolò Sperotto (born 1992), Italian footballer

Italian-language surnames